Honduriella is a genus of mites in the Phytoseiidae family.

Species
 Honduriella maxima Denmark & Evans, in Denmark, Evans, Aguilar, Vargas & Ochoa 1999

References

Phytoseiidae